Rasambek Aslambekovich Akhmatov (born 31 May 1996) is a Russian professional footballer who plays as a midfielder for Liga I club Chindia Târgoviște.

Career
Rasambek arrived in France in 2003 with his family after escaping from the war in Chechnya. He moved to Haguenau in 2005 and discovered a passion for football at age of 10 at the city stadium in small district in Haguenau before signing his first contract at 11 years of age at FR Haguenau. He would subsequently play in several Alsacian clubs before joining FCSR Obernai with the senior team. Then with determination, he tried his luck during scouting, which was organized in Paris by an American team, and out of the 800 players, he was one of the 10 selected to spend 2 weeks of testing in Miami. He finally joined the FC Miami City team, which at the time played in the American third division. After two seasons in Miami, he was noticed by Swope Park Rangers (second division), where he signed a first professional contract in the summer of 2018.

After two full seasons in Kansas City, he returned to France. During the pandemic, he spent several months without a club before signing for Comuna Recea in the Romanian second division.

Following a short stint with Kazakh side Maktaaral, he returned to Romania to join Liga I club Chindia Târgoviște.

References 

Rassambek Akhmatov’    Article LAFA

Article Dernières nouvelles d’Alsace’

Article SportExpress Russia

External links 
 Swope Park Profile
Interview Miami

1996 births
Living people
Sportspeople from Chechnya
Russian emigrants to France
Russian footballers
Russian people of Chechen descent
Association football midfielders
FCSR Haguenau players
FC Miami City players
ASPV Strasbourg players
Sporting Kansas City II players
CS Academica Recea players
AFC Chindia Târgoviște players
USL Championship players
USL League Two players
Liga II players
Kazakhstan Premier League players
Liga I players
Russian expatriate footballers
Russian expatriate sportspeople in France
Expatriate footballers in France
Russian expatriate sportspeople in the United States
Expatriate soccer players in the United States
Russian expatriate sportspeople in Romania
Expatriate footballers in Romania
Russian expatriate sportspeople in Kazakhstan
Expatriate footballers in Kazakhstan